DWDW (88.7 FM) was a radio station owned and operated by Prime Broadcasting Network, Inc. The station's main studio was located in Macasaet Business Complex, Roxas St., Puerto Princesa, Palawan.

From its inception in 2015 until the move to Palawan Broadcasting Corporation's 89.5 MHz in May 2022, it served as the flagship station of the Radyo Bandera network, under the operations of Bandera News Philippines.

References

Radio stations in Puerto Princesa
Radio stations established in 2015